Connell Pond is a freshwater frozen pond in the Labyrinth of Wright Valley, McMurdo Dry Valleys. It was named by the Advisory Committee on Antarctic Names (2004) after Laurie Connell of the University of Maine, the leader of a United States Antarctic Program field party that sampled the pond in 2003–04.

References 

Lakes of Victoria Land
McMurdo Dry Valleys